"Always" is a song by American producer MK featuring Alana. It was released in November 1992 as the lead single from their debut album. The song reached number-one on the US Billboard Hot Dance Club Songs chart in February 1993 It was released in the UK in January 1995 and subsequently reached number 69 on the UK Singles Chart.

Weekly charts

Route 94 remix

In 2013, the song was remixed by Route 94. The remix entered the UK Singles Chart at number 12 after its re-release in 2014.

Weekly charts

Certifications

References

1992 singles
1992 songs
MK (DJ) songs
Charisma Records singles
Songs written by Marc Kinchen